The African Fencing Championships are an annual top-level fencing tournament organized by the African Fencing Confederation. They serve as zone championships for the Fencing World Cup run by the International Fencing Federation.

Editions

Statistics 1991-2022

Points Wins by country

All Time Medal table  1991 - 2022

See also
 Fencing at the Summer Olympics
 World Fencing Championships
 other zone championships: Asian Fencing Championships, European Fencing Championships, Pan American Fencing Championships

References

 Results and statistics at the International Fencing Federation

 
Fencing competitions
Fencing competitions in Africa
Recurring sporting events established in 2006